Theria is a genus of moths in the family Geometridae erected by Jacob Hübner in 1825.

Species
 Theria crypta Wehrli, 1940
 Theria primaria (Haworth, 1809)
 Theria rupicapraria (Denis & Schiffermüller, 1775)

References

Ennominae
Geometridae genera